The Relativity of Wrong is a 1988 collection of seventeen essays on science by American writer and scientist Isaac Asimov. The book explores and contrasts the viewpoint that "all theories are proven wrong in time", arguing that there exist degrees of wrongness.

The book was the twentieth of a series of books collecting essays from The Magazine of Fantasy and Science Fiction. Like most of the essays Asimov wrote for F&SF, each one in The Relativity of Wrong begins with an autobiographical anecdote which serves to set the mood. Several of the essays form a sequence explaining the discovery and uses of isotopes.

Title essay
In the title essay, Asimov argues that there exist degrees of wrongness, and being wrong in one way is not necessarily as bad as being wrong in another way.  For example, if a child spells the word sugar as "pqzzf", the child is clearly incorrect.  Yet, Asimov says, a child who spells the word "shuger" (or in some other phonetic way) is "less wrong" than one who writes a random sequence of letters.  Furthermore, a child who writes "sucrose" or "C12H22O11" completely disregards the "correct" spelling but shows a degree of knowledge about the real thing under study.  Asimov proposes that a better test question would ask the student to spell sugar in as many ways as possible, justifying each.

Likewise, believing that the Earth is a sphere is less wrong than believing that the Earth is flat, but wrong nonetheless, since it is really an oblate spheroid or a reasonable approximation thereof.  As the state of knowledge advanced, the statement of the Earth's shape became more refined, and each successive advance required a more careful and subtle investigation. Equating the wrongness of the theory that the Earth is flat with the wrongness of the theory that the Earth is a perfect sphere is wronger than wrong.

Asimov wrote "The Relativity of Wrong" in response to an "English Literature major" who criticized him for believing in scientific progress.  This unnamed individual is portrayed by Asimov as having taken the postmodern viewpoint that all scientific explanations of the world are equally in error.  Irritated, the rationalist Asimov put forth his views in his monthly F&SF column, and the result became the title essay of this collection.

Asimov judges that, unlike some previous scientific theories, between relativity and quantum theory scientists have discovered the final foundations of science.

Other essays 
Another topic debunks the mythical lunar effect that links the human female menstrual cycle to the phases of the Moon. Some chapters focus on chemistry; one chapter discusses naturally occurring radioactive isotopes in the body, while other chapters describe the alchemical and biochemical histories of phosphorus. In a discussion on space travel, Asimov argues that interstellar travel will always be impractical, and that thus we will not visit nor be visited by alien intelligence. The book includes Asimov's conflicts with Harold Urey over Columbia's graduate chemistry program. "The Incredible Shrinking Planet" examines historically shrinking estimates of Pluto's size, which leads Asimov to coin that Pluto is what Asimov calls a "mesoplanet", a planet in-between major and minor planets in size. He also examines the history of the identification of Andromeda as a galaxy rather than a nebula.

Contents
"The Moon and We" (April 1986)
"The Minor Objects" (May 1986)
"The Second Lightest" (June 1986)
"Labels on the Molecules" (July 1986)
"The Consequences of Pie" (August 1986)
"The Enemy Within" (September 1986)
"The Relativity of Wrong" (October 1986)
"The Unmentionable Planet" (November 1986)
"The Dead-End Middle" (December 1986)
"Opposite!" (January 1987)
"Sail On! Sail On!" (February 1987)
"The Incredible Shrinking Planet" (March 1987)
"The Light-Bringer" (April 1987)
"Beginning With Bone" (May 1987)
"New Stars" (June 1987)
"Brightening Stars" (July 1987)
"Super-Exploding Stars" (August 1987)

References

External links
 Asimovonline.com

1988 non-fiction books
Essay collections by Isaac Asimov
Philosophy of science literature
Works originally published in The Magazine of Fantasy & Science Fiction
Doubleday (publisher) books